Ljubov Nikolaevna Vassiljeva (Любовь Николаевна Васильева; 6 January 1901 – 7 July 1985) was a Soviet botanist, mycologist, and bryologist.

Biography
Vassiljeva was born in Saratov on 6 January 1901. She studied under  at Kazan Federal University, graduating in 1925. She returned to graduate school, specializing in bryology under Lidija Ivanovna Savic-Ljubickaja. She taught at Kazan as an assistant professor until 1940. During World War II, she worked at the Botanical Institute of the Academy of Sciences of the USSR.

In 1944, Vassiljeva moved to the Russian Far East, becoming an employee of the Siberian Branch of the Russian Academy of Sciences. She founded her own botanical laboratory at the academy in 1949, which she headed for 17 years.

Legacy
Vassiljeva has several species named in her honor, including: Hysteronaevia vassiljevae, Leucoagaricus vassiljevae, Mycoleptodonoides vassiljevae, Russula vassilievae, and Sarcoscypha vassiljevae.

Selected publications

References

1901 births
1985 deaths
Soviet botanists
Soviet women scientists